Xinjiang, an autonomous region of the People's Republic of China, is made up of the following administrative divisions.

Administrative divisions
These administrative divisions are explained in greater detail at Administrative divisions of the People's Republic of China. The following table lists only the prefecture-level and county-level divisions of Xinjiang.

Recent changes in administrative divisions

Population composition

Prefectures

Counties

Drafted and proposed cities

Short-term drafted cities
County-level cities under Xinjiang UAR government
 Zhundong

County-level cities under XPCC (Bingtuan)
 Wuxing
 Yulong
 Wushishui

County into county-level cities under Xinjiang UAR government
 Guqung ← Qitai [Guqung] County
 Yarkant [Yerqiang] ←  [Yarkant] County

Mid-term drafted cities
County into county-level cities under Xinjiang UAR government
 Sawen ← Shawan [Sawen] County
 Künes ← Xinyuan [Künes] County
 Piqan ← Shanshan [Piqan] County
 Bügür ← Luntai [Bügür] County 
 Hejing ← Hejing County
 Qarkilik ← Ruoqiang [Qarkilik] County
 Dörbiljin ← Emin [Dörbiljin] County

Long-term drafted cities
County into county-level cities under Xinjiang UAR government
 Kargilik ← Yecheng [Kargilik] County
 Bay ← Baicheng [Bay] County
 Uqturpan ← Wushi [Uqturpan] County
 Keriya ← Yutian [Keriya] County
 Makit ← Maigaiti [Makit] County
 Peyziwat ← Jiashi [Payzawat] County
 Maralbexi ← Bachu [Maralbexi] County

County-level cities under XPCC (Bingtuan)
 Jinyinchuan
 Fangxin
 Xiayedi
 Tarim
 Milan
 Nantun
 Beiting
 Qianhai
 Mosuowan
 Tianger

Proposed cities
Proposed prefecture-level cities under Xinjiang UAR government
 Guqung (Prefecture-level city) ← Guqung
 Kuqa [Qiuqi] (Prefecture-level city) ← Kuqa [Qiuqi]
 Yarkant [Yerqiang] (Prefecture-level city) ← Yarkant [Yerqiang]

References 

 
Xinjiang